Kevin Keasey, FRSA is Professor of Financial Services, Director of the International Institute of Banking and Financial Services (IIBFS) and Director of the Centre for Advanced Studies in Finance at Leeds University Business School, University of Leeds. He is a Fellow of the Royal Society of Arts, the CEO Circle (a group of the leading CEOs in the UK) and the Northern Region Advisory panel of the Stock Exchange.

Career
Keasey has a BA in Economics from the University of Durham, an MA in Public and Industrial Economics from the University of Newcastle upon Tyne and a PhD in Economics also from Newcastle. He was a Reader in Accounting and Finance at the University of Warwick until  1989 when he was appointed to his current post at Leeds.

Keasey established and developed the International Institute of Banking and Financial Services. In 2005, he established the Centre for Advanced Studies in Finance (CASIF), a doctoral school specialising in a small number of advanced subjects in finance. He founded Ecom Group Ltd and was a founder and chairman of Aquilo plc until the end of 2006. During 2009 and 2010 he was responsible for co-ordinating the teaching and research of enterprise studies at the University of Leeds and initiated the Leeds Enterprise Centre. He has held director and non-executive positions at several companies in information technology industry.

Research
The 1997 Journal of Management survey ranked Keasey the joint 7th most published author globally, and one of his articles was ranked as a top 50 worldwide management article in 2007. Currently, he is an editor or included in editorial board of five academic journals, such as Journal of Financial Regulation and Compliance, Journal of International Banking Regulation, and Journal of Accounting and Finance. He has authored 12 books, monographs and edited volumes on corporate governance, financial regulation and financial services, small business and financial markets, and behavioural finance.

References

External links
 Professor Kevin Keasey, Leeds University Business School
 Center for Innovations in Health Management

Academics of the University of Leeds
Academics of the University of Warwick
Alumni of St Cuthbert's Society, Durham
Living people
Alumni of Newcastle University
Year of birth missing (living people)